Naum Lvovich Shtarkman (28 September 1927, Zhitomir - 19 July 2006, Moscow) was a Soviet and Russian classical pianist.

He was a student of Konstantin Igumnov at the Moscow Conservatory. Shtarkman was awarded a 5th prize at the V International Chopin Piano Competition and, most notably, attained the Bronze Medal at the inaugural edition of the Tchaikovsky Competition. He had previously won the 1st place at Vianna da Motta International Music Competition. For several decades his concert career was restricted to the Soviet scene.

Shtarkman was a professor at the Gnessin State Musical College and the Moscow Conservatory.

The first concert with an orchestra, Mendelssohn concerto, he has played at age 11. Incredibly quickly, a year later, he gave a solo concert at the Great Hall of the Conservatory, a program which consisted of works by Bach, Beethoven, Chopin, Schumann, Liszt. In 1944 he began studying at the Moscow Conservatory in the class of the great pianist and teacher Konstantin Igumnov.

He graduated from the Tchaikovsky Moscow Conservatory in 1949, under the instruction of Constantine Igumnov ( Igumnov died in 1948, but Naum Shtarkman refused to finish training with another teacher, and was preparing for graduation without a formal mentor, informal consultation with Sviatoslav Richter).

In the 1950s he participated in various international competitions, becoming, in particular, the first winner of the International Piano Competition, named Vianna da Motta (Lisbon, 1957) and received the third prize of the First International Tchaikovsky Competition (1958). However, shortly thereafter, Shtarkman was arrested and convicted under Article 121 of the Criminal Code of the RSFSR (homosexuality). He was arrested in Kharkov, hours before he was scheduled to perform at a factory, as a special performance.

Despite the brevity of the incarceration (8 years), this has totally shattered his concert career: for years Shtarkman was allowed only to perform in the far off provinces or in the secondary concert halls.  The arrest had also become an impediment to educational activities of Shtarkman: from 1969 he freelanced unofficially at the School of Gnessin and only in 1987 became a professor at the Moscow Conservatory. After that he began to perform in many countries around the world.

Since 1993, Shtarkman was the permanent chairman of the jury of the International Competition of Pianists named after Igumnov, ongoing in Lipetsk.

References
Fryderyk Chopin Information Centre

1927 births
2006 deaths
Musicians from Zhytomyr
Prize-winners of the International Chopin Piano Competition
Russian classical pianists
Male classical pianists
Russian Jews
Soviet Jews
Ukrainian classical pianists
Ukrainian Jews
20th-century classical pianists
Jewish classical pianists
20th-century Russian male musicians